IllumiNations was a series of nightly fireworks shows at Epcot before IllumiNations: Reflections of Earth was created in 1999 for the Walt Disney World Millennium Celebration.

Le Carnaval de Lumière
The first evening presentation,   Le Carnaval de Lumière, premiered on October 23, 1982. It celebrated world festivals with fountains, film, music, and other effects. The show used rear projection screens on barges floating on the World Showcase Lagoon. Between the projection barges were fountain/fireworks barges controlled by Apple computers. The show could be viewed only from points between the Mexican and Canadian pavilions.

A New World Fantasy

A New World Fantasy was the 2nd version of a fireworks show at Epcot and was set to classical music played on synthesizer.  It opened in June 1983 and used floating barges that had rear projection screens on them.  The barges were the same as the first show at Epcot, Carnival de Lumiere.  The show also added 'Pichel lights' that moved automatically.

Most of the soundtrack can be found on Don Dorsey's album "Busted", but the "Great Parades and Pageants" segment was removed. The complete soundtrack can be found on a promotional Don Dorsey album.

Show program

Fanfare
1. "Fanfare" from La Péri
 Paul Dukas

Act I: Celebrations on Land
2. Symphony No. 5, First Movement
 Ludwig van Beethoven
3. "Flight Of The Bumblebee" from The Tale of the Tsar Sultan
 Nikolai Rimsky-Korsakov

4. Zampa Overture
 Louis Joseph Ferdinand Herold

5. Piano Concerto No. 1, Third Movement
 Ludwig van Beethoven

6. La Vie Parisienne

 Jacques Offenbach
7. "Dance Of The Comedians" from The Bartered Bride
 Bedřich Smetana
8. "Bourrée" from the Water Music Suite
 George Frideric Handel

9. Brandenburg Concerto No. 5, First Movement
 Johann Sebastian Bach

10. Orpheus In Hades, Galop
 Jacques Offenbach
11. Trisch-Trasch Polka
 Johann Strauss II

12. Italian Concerto, Third Movement
 Johann Sebastian Bach

13. William Tell Overture

 Gioacchino Rossini

Act II: Great Parades and Pageants
14. "Procession of The Nobles" from Mlada
 Nikolai Rimsky-Korsakov
15. "March" from Love For Three Oranges
 Sergei Prokofiev
16. "Farandole" from L'Arlesienne Suite No. 2
 Georges Bizet

17. March Militaire

 Franz Schubert
18. "March of The Toreadors" from Carmen
 Georges Bizet
19. The Marriage of Figaro, Aria
 Wolfgang Amadeus Mozart

20. Light Cavalry Overture

 Franz von Suppé

21. Radetsky March

 Johann Strauss I
22. "Procession of The Nobles" from Mlada
 Nikolai Rimsky-Korsakov
23. March Hongroise
 Hector Berlioz
24. "Anvil Chorus" from Il Trovatore
 Giuseppe Verdi
25. Hands Across the Sea
 John Philip Sousa

Act III: Revelries in Pyrotechnics
26. Carnival Overture

 Antonín Dvořák
27. "Overture" from Carmen
 Georges Bizet
28. "Alla Hornpipe" from the Water Music Suite
 George Frideric Handel

29. Symphony No. 1 in D, "Titan"; First Movement
 Gustav Mahler

30. Symphony No. 9, "Choral"; Fourth Movement
 Ludwig van Beethoven

31. "Lohengrin"; Prelude to Act 3
 Richard Wagner
32. Firebird Suite, Finale
 Igor Stravinsky
33. "Great Gate of Kiev" from Pictures at an Exhibition
 Modest Mussorgsky
34. "Promenade (Reprise)" from Pictures at an Exhibition
 Modest Mussorgsky
35. "1812 Festival Overture"
 Pyotr Ilyich Tchaikovsky

Laserphonic Fantasy

This show has the same soundtrack as A New World Fantasy. It featured lasers emitted from barges and from around the lagoon. The "Skater" segment featured the first use of non-continuous lines in a laser animation and was the first use of laser graphics on a water-droplet screen.
 Most of the soundtrack can be found on Don Dorsey's album "Busted", but the "Great Parades and Pageants" segment was removed.
 The complete soundtrack can be found on a promotional Don Dorsey album.

IllumiNations

This show used most of the arrangements for "A New World Fantasy" and "Laserphonic Fantasy," but instead of being arranged solely with synthesizers, the resulting arrangements were rescored for full orchestra, mostly using the original orchestration by the composers. New music was created for the show's theme by Don Dorsey and Bruce Healey. The "Great Parades and Pageants" section used in the previous installments was omitted and replaced with a celebration of all the individual countries of World Showcase (except Norway, which had just opened by the show's premiere). This installment of IllumiNations began a radical new use for effects in fireworks shows. To add to the Pichel lights, fountains, laser barges, and laser graphics projected behind the fountains, the directors made the lights representing the different interact with the music and the rest of the show. In another strange turn of events, they decided not to use fireworks until the very end of the second act, and then the third act would show the fireworks off at their best.

Show program

Opening

Act I
1. Symphony #5 Movement #1
 Composer: Ludwig van Beethoven
2. "Flight of the Bumblebee" from Tale Of The Tsar Sultan
 Composer: Nikolai Rimsky-Korsakov
3. Zampa Overture first theme
 Composer: Louis Joseph Ferdinand Herold
4. Italian Concerto Movement # 3, first theme
 Composer: Johann Sebastian Bach
5. William Tell Overture second theme
 Composer: Giachhino Rossini

Act II: World Showcase
6. Scheherezade
 Composer: Nicholas Rimsky-Korsakov
7. Orphée aux Enfers, Galop Infernal (France)
 Composer: Jacques Offenbach
8. Days of Emancipation (China)
 Composer: Zhu Jian'er
9. Rule Britannia (United Kingdom)
 Composer: Thomas Augustine Arne
10. Tales of the Vienna Woods (Germany)
 Composer: Johann Strauss
11. Sakura (Japan)
 Composer: Unknown
12. España Cani (Mexico)
 Composer: Marquina
13. French Canadian Jig Traditional (Canada)
 Composer: Unknown
14. Funiculì, Funiculà (Italy)
 Composer: Luigi Denza
15. Rhapsody in Blue (United States)
 Composer: George Gershwin

Act III: Finale
16. Carnival Overture Opus 92, first theme
 Composer: Antonín Dvořák
17. "March of the Toreadors" from Carmen, Prelude to Act 1
 Composer: Georges Bizet
18. Alla Hornpipe from Water Music Suite, Movement #13
 Composer: George Fredrick Handel
19. Titan Symphony Symphony #1 in D Major, Movement #1
 Composer: Gustav Mahler
20. "Ode to Joy" Symphony #9 in D Minor (Choral), Movement #4
 Composer: Ludwig van Beethoven
21. Prelude to Act III "Lohengrin"
 Composer: Richard Wagner
22. Firebird Suite Finale
 Composer: Igor Stravinsky
23. "Great Gate of Kiev" from Pictures at an Exhibition
 Composer: Modest Mussorgsky
24. "Promenade" from Pictures at an Exhibition
 Composer: Modest Mussorgsky
25. 1812 Festival Overture second theme
 Composer: Pyotr Ilyich Tschaikovsky

Music produced by Don Dorsey

Post Show
Versions of "It's a Small World" and General Electric's theme were played.

New Year's Eve 1993
For the New Year's Eve finale in 1992–1993, a version of "We've Just Begun To Dream" was played during the countdown, then a version of "Auld Lang Syne" followed by a short reprise of "We've Just Begun To Dream". Finally, a selection from Around the World with Mickey Mouse, that in the future would be played at the Fountain of Nations, was played.

Holiday IllumiNations

Holiday IllumiNations played during the holiday season instead of the regular show. Starting in 2004, the "Let There Be Peace on Earth" segment of Holiday IllumiNations is played after IllumiNations: Reflections of Earth during the holiday season.

Show program

Opening

 Opening Medley
 "Hark! The Herald Angels Sing"
 "O Come All Ye Faithful"
 "Joy to the World"
 "Deck the Halls With Boughs of Holly"
 "Angels We Have Heard on High"
 Nutcracker Medley
 "Marches"
 "Dance of the Sugar Plum Fairies"
 "Russian Dance (Trepak)"
 O Holy Night
 Chanukah Medley
 "S'Vivon"
 "The Trees in the Field"
 Let There Be Peace on Earth

Closing

Post show
 "Joy to the World"
 "What Child Is This?"

Production
Narration
 Walter Cronkite
All Instrumentals
 Czech Symphonic Orchestra
All Chorus Parts
 The Sarah Moore Singers
O Holy Night
 Vocals by Sandi Patti
Let There Be Peace on Earth
 Vocals by The Boys Choir of Harlem

Show facts
 Opening date: 1994
 Closing date: 1998
 Duration: 12 minutes
 Sponsor: General Electric

IllumiNations 25 (A)

Created for the 25th anniversary of Walt Disney World.

Show program

Opening

1. "Remember The Magic" - World Showcase Salute
 Canada
 Europe (Italy)
 France
 Germany
 United Kingdom (British Isles)
 Scandinavia (Norway)
 Africa (Morocco)
 China
 Japan
 Mexico
 United States

Act 1: World Showcase
2. "A Worldwide Celebration" (by Gregory Rians Smith) 

3. Mascleta
 Calypso
4. "International Fantasy"
 Movements:
 Asian
 African
 South American
 British
 Flamenco
 Eastern European
 Middle Eastern
 Polka
5. Mascleta
 Calypso

Act 2: Future World
6. "Discovery Suite"
 Theme and Variations:
Life
 Innoventions
 Imagination
 Seas
 Land
 Energy
 Motion
 Communication

Act 3: Finale
7. "Circle of Life"

Closing

Post show
Versions of "A Worldwide Celebration" and General Electric's theme were played.

Production
 "Remember The Magic" - World Showcase Salute
 Based on the Walt Disney World 25th Anniversary tune
 Lyricist: Cheryl Berman
 Composer: Ira Antelis
 Arranger & Orchestrator: Gregory Smith
 "A Worldwide Celebration"
 Composer & Orchestrator: Gregory Smith
 Mascleta
 Composer & Orchestrator: Gregory Smith
 "International Fantasy"
 Composer & Orchestrator: Gregory Smith
 "Discovery Suite"
 Based on "We've Just Begun to Dream" (EPCOT Center fanfare) by Steve Skorija, Gregory Smith, and Jack Eskew
 Composer & Orchestrator: Gregory Smith
 "Circle of Life"
 Lyricist: Tim Rice
 Composer: Elton John
 Arrangers: Gregory Smith & Oliver Wells
 Orchestrator: Gregory Smith

Production From CD
 Music produced by Steve Skorija
 Music supervision by Dan Savant
 All songs except "Circle of Life" arranged by Gregory Smith
 "Circle of Life" arranged by Oliver Wells
 Vocals recorded by Andy de Ganahl at Starke Lake Studios, Orlando, Florida
 Mixed by Eric Shilling at Starke Lake Studios, Orlando, Florida
 Digital editing by Michael Atwell
 Vocal solo in "Circle of Life" by John Madgett
 Special thanks to: The Florida Mass Choir under the direction of Arthur Jones, Taz Morosi, and Keith Dyer
 Chorus:
 Sarah Moore (leader)
 Amy Martin-Cole
 Michelle Amato-Hann
 Greg Whipple
 Randy Nichols
 Scott Harell

Show facts
 Opening date: September 21, 1996
 Closing date: May 18, 1997
 Duration: 12 minutes
 Sponsor: General Electric
 Soundtrack: Disneyland/Walt Disney World Music Vacation
 The selections "A Worldwide Celebration", Mascleta, "International Fantasy" & "Discovery Suite" can be found on Disney's Music From The Park (1996 CD).

IllumiNations 25 (B)

Still celebrating the 25th anniversary of Walt Disney World Resort, but the classical music returns.

Show program
1. "Remember The Magic" - World Showcase Salute (Based on the Walt Disney World 25th Anniversary tune) [1996]
 Lyricist: Cheryl Berman
 Composer: Ira Antelis
 Arranger: Gregory Smith
 Orchestrator: Gregory Smith
 Singer: Brian McKnight
2. "IllumiNations Fanfare" [1997]
 Arranger: John Debney
 Orchestrator: Brad Dechter

Act I: World Showcase
3. Russian Dance - "Trepak" from The Nutcracker Ballet [1892]
 Composer: Peter Ilyich Tchaikovsky
 Arranger: John Debney
 Orchestrator: Brad Dechter
4. "Die Meistersinger Overture" from Die Meistersinger von Nürnberg [1862-67]
 Composer: Richard Wagner
 Arranger: John Debney
 Orchestrator: Brad Dechter
5. "Laideronette, Empress of the Pagodas" from "Ma Mére l'Oye" (Mother Goose Suite) [1910]
 Composer: Maurice Ravel
 Arranger: John Debney
 Orchestrator: Brad Dechter
6. "Barber of Seville Overture" from Il barbiere de Siviglia (The Barber of Seville) [1816]
 Composer: Gioacchino Rossini
 Arranger: John Debney
 Orchestrator: Brad Dechter
7. "Overture" to Suite No. 2 from Daphnis et Chloé Ballet [1912]
 Composer: Maurice Ravel
 Arranger: John Debney
 Orchestrator: Brad Dechter
8. "Seventeen Come Sunday" March from English Folk Song Suite [1924]
 Composer: Ralph Vaughan Williams
 Arranger: John Debney
 Orchestrator: Brad Dechter
9. "El Salòn México" [1936]
 Composer: Aaron Copland
 Arranger: John Debney
 Orchestrator: Brad Dechter
10. "Hoedown" from Rodeo Ballet [1942]
 Composer: Aaron Copland
 Arranger: John Debney
 Orchestrator: Brad Dechter

Act II: Future World
11. "Pini della Villa Borghese" from The Pines of Rome Symphonic Poem [1919]
 Composer: Ottorino Respighi
 Arranger: John Debney
 Orchestrator: Brad Dechter
12. "The Aquarium" from Le Carnival des Animaux (The Carnival of the Animals) [1907]
 Composer: Camille Saint-Saëns
 Arranger: John Debney
 Orchestrator: Brad Dechter
13. "Hornpipe" from Water Music Suite [1717]
 Composer: George Frideric Händel
 Arranger: John Debney
 Orchestrator: Brad Dechter
14. "A Night on Bald Mountain" [1886]
 Composer: Modest Mussorgsky
 Arranger: John Debney
 Orchestrator: Brad Dechter
15. "Jupiter, the Bringer of Jollity" from The Planets Suite [1914–1916]
 Composer: Gustav Holst
 Arranger: John Debney
 Orchestrator: Brad Dechter
16. "El Sombrero de Tres Picos" from The Three-Cornered Hat Ballet [1917]
 Composer: Manuel de Falla
 Arranger: John Debney
 Orchestrator: Brad Dechter
17. "Ode To Joy" Symphony No. 9 in D minor (Choral), Fourth Movement [1824]
 Composer: Ludwig van Beethoven
 Arranger: John Debney
 Orchestrator: Brad Dechter(Soundtrack Version)
 Conductor: Georg Solti(Walt Disney World Version)

Post Show
"A Worldwide Celebration" [1996]
 Composer: Gregory Smith
 Orchestrator: Gregory Smith

Show facts
 Opening date: May 19, 1997
 Closing date: January 31, 1998
 Duration: 13 minutes
 Sponsor: General Electric
 Soundtrack: Disneyland/Walt Disney World: The Official Album (1997 CD)

IllumiNations '98

Same soundtrack as IllumiNations 25 (B) but without the 25th anniversary announcement.

Opening

See also
 Epcot attraction and entertainment history
 IllumiNations: Reflections of Earth

References

External links
 Disney History: October 23 Timeline
 The Story Behind IllumiNations

Epcot
Walt Disney Parks and Resorts fireworks
World Showcase
Former Walt Disney Parks and Resorts attractions
General Electric sponsorships